Nicolas Dwynn Coster (born December 3, 1933) is a British-American actor, most known for his work in daytime drama and as a character actor on nighttime television series, such as Wonder Woman, Buck Rogers in the 25th Century, T. J. Hooker and Star Trek: The Next Generation.

Life and career
Coster was born in London to an American mother and a New Zealand father who was a London theatre critic and marine commander. Coster was raised in the United States, primarily in California.

Coster returned to England to study acting at the Royal Academy of the Dramatic Art. He also studied acting with Lee Strasberg in New York City. Coster was in Twigs with Sada Thompson, Seesaw with Michele Lee, Otherwise Engaged with Tom Courtenay, and Little Foxes with Elizabeth Taylor, which was staged on Broadway and the Victoria Theatre in London.

Coster appeared in the NBC soap opera Young Doctor Malone. He created the role of Professor Paul Britton on The Secret Storm, a role he played in 1964 and from 1967 to 1968. He played John Eldridge in the primetime serialized drama Our Private World and on As the World Turns. His first appearance on television was an episode of The U.S. Steel Hour in 1959. Coster has appeared more than 80 times on 36 television shows, notably in the role of David Warner, the father of character Blair Warner, on the sitcom The Facts of Life. 

Coster created the role of Robert Delaney on Somerset in March 1970 and later moved to Another World playing the same character. He played gangster-turned-informant Anthony Makana on One Life to Live, but left that series to create the role of Lionel Lockridge on Santa Barbara. He played kidnapper Steve Andrews on the ABC soap opera All My Children and returned to Another World for its 25th anniversary in 1989. He returned to his role on Santa Barbara in 1990 until the show was canceled in January 1993. He appeared on As the World Turns from 1993–1995.

Personal life
Coster is a scuba diving instructor and maintains a foundation that organizes sailing trips and teaches scuba diving for people who are disabled. Coster has a captain's license.  Coster married actress Candace Hilligoss (divorced 1981), with whom he has two children.

Selected film roles

 Titanic (1953) - Seaman (uncredited)
 The Desert Rats (1953) - Medic (uncredited)
 Sea of Lost Ships (1953) - Cadet Wilson (uncredited)
 The Outcast (1954) - Asa Polsen
 The Black Shield of Falworth (1954) - Humphrey, Young Squire (uncredited)
 The Eternal Sea (1955) - Student (uncredited)
 City of Shadows (1955) - Roy Fellows
 Light Fantastic (1964)
 My Blood Runs Cold (1965) - Harry Lindsay
 The Sporting Club (1971) - James Quinn
 1776 (1972) - South Carolina Delegate (uncredited)
 All the President's Men (1976) - Markham
 Ebony, Ivory & Jade (1976) - Linderman
 MacArthur (1977) - Colonel Huff
 The Court-Martial George Armstrong Custer (1977) - Gen. Philip Sheridan
 The Big Fix (1978) - Spitzler
 Slow Dancing in the Big City (1978) - David Fillmore
 The Word (1978, TV Mini-Series) - Peter Ajemian
 A Fire in the Sky (1978, TV Movie) - Governor
 The Solitary Man (1979 TV Movie) - Bud Henson
 Goldengirl (1979) - US Olympic Team Doctor
 Just You and Me, Kid (1979) - Harris
 The Concorde ... Airport '79 (1979) - Dr. Stone
 The Electric Horseman (1979) - Fitzgerald
 Little Darlings (1980) - Mr. Whitney
 The Hunter (1980) - Poker Player (uncredited)
 Why Would I Lie? (1980) - Walter
 Stir Crazy (1980) - Warden Henry Sampson
 The Pursuit of D.B. Cooper (1981) - Avery
 Reds (1981) - Paul Trullinger
 The Day the Bubble Burst (1982 TV Movie)
 M.A.D.D.: Mother Against Drunk Drivers (1983 TV Movie) - Maurice Carver
 Princess Daisy (1983 TV Movie) - Matty Firestone
 Beverly Hills Madam (1986) - Uncle Edgar
 Big Business (1988) - Hunt Shelton
 How I Got into College (1989) - Dr. Phillip Jellinak, Sr.
 Incident at Dark River (1989 TV Movie) - Mr. Gorman
 Betsy's Wedding (1990) - Harry Lovell
 By Dawn's Early Light (1990 TV Movie) - General Renning
 Natural Selection (1994)
 Full Circle (1996 TV Movie) - Arthur
 Hearts Adrift (1996 TV Movie) - Harry Winslow
 Freedom Strike (1998) - Adm. Torrance
 Love Happens (1999) - Charles
 Blood Type (1999) - Bum Joe
 The Dukes of Hazzard: Hazzard in Hollywood (2000, TV Movie) - Ezra Bushmaster
 Plot 7 (2007) - Mr. Stewart
 Race (2008) - Jack Gibson
 Family of Four (2009) - Dr. Wallace
 Flower Girl (2009 TV Movie) - Gavin Green
 Cold Turkey (2013) - Steve Utley
 Dancing on a Dry Salt Lake (2013) - Dr. Woodley
 The Southside (2015) - Mr. Bradshaw
 Chemical Cut (2016) - Veteran
 A Winter Rose (2016) - Drunk
 The Deep Ones (2020) - Bob Finley

References

External links
 
 
 Nicolas Coster and Challenge Foundation

Living people
1933 births
Alumni of RADA
American male film actors
American male soap opera actors
American male television actors
American people of New Zealand descent
English male film actors
English male soap opera actors
Male actors from California
Male actors from London